Keita Morimoto (森本 啓太, Morimoto Keita, born January 8, 1990) is a Japanese artist. Morimoto was born in Osaka, Japan before moving to Toronto, Ontario, Canada at the age of 16. Morimoto graduated from Ontario College of Art & Design (now OCAD University) in 2012 with a Bachelor of Fine Arts.

Morimoto is best known for his cityscapes and portraits painted with theatrical light that is reminiscent of Rembrandt and Edward Hopper. He brings classical techniques into the present and transforms mundane streets into extraordinary worlds. Art critic and writer Murray Whyte of the Toronto Star called Morimoto a painter in the New Romantic style.Through his practice, Morimoto questions the structural fragility and moral codes of contemporary life by focusing his attention on everyday subjects such as vending machines, fast food restaurants and parking lots. Using the historically symbolic motif of light, he combines its natural and sacred connotations with products of consumerist and industrial culture. His work has been exhibited at the Museum of Contemporary Art Toronto Canada (MOCA), Art Gallery of Peterborough, The Power Plant Contemporary Art Gallery, and Fort Wayne Museum of Art.

References 

Japanese emigrants to Canada
Japanese artists
Living people
1990 births
OCAD University alumni